Patricia Anne "Patty" Dillon Cafferata (born November 24, 1940) is an American politician and lawyer.

Born in Albany, New York, Cafferata graduated from Lewis and Clark College with a degree in elementary education and received her J.D. degree from Southwestern University School of Law. She practiced law in Reno, Nevada. Her mother was Barbara Vucanovich who served in the United States House of Representatives from Nevada and her grandfather was General Thomas Farrell. In 1978, she was elected to the Nevada Assembly as a Republican. Then in 1982, Cafferata was elected Nevada State Treasurer. She also served as district attorney in three Nevada counties. Cafferata has also written several books and articles. Cafferata was the Republican nominee for Governor of Nevada in 1986, losing in a landslide to popular incumbent Richard Bryan.

References

External links
 Patricia D. Cafferata papers, 93-69, Special Collections, University Libraries, University of Nevada, Reno. 
 Patricia D. Cafferata papers, 2010-03, Special Collections, University Libraries, University of Nevada, Reno.

|-

1940 births
District attorneys in Nevada
Lawyers from Albany, New York
Lewis & Clark College alumni
Living people
Republican Party members of the Nevada Assembly
Nevada lawyers
Politicians from Albany, New York
Politicians from Reno, Nevada
Southwestern Law School alumni
State treasurers of Nevada
Women in Nevada politics
Women state legislators in Nevada
Writers from Nevada
Writers from Albany, New York
21st-century American women
Hispanic and Latino American women in politics